PAVA spray is an incapacitant spray similar to pepper spray. It is dispensed from a handheld canister, in a liquid stream. It contains a 0.3% solution of pelargonic acid vanillylamide (PAVA), also called nonivamide, a synthetic capsaicinoid (analogue of capsaicin), in a solvent of aqueous ethanol. The propellant is nitrogen. This solution has been selected because this is the minimum concentration which will fulfill the purpose of the equipment; namely to minimise a person's capacity for resistance, without unnecessarily prolonging their discomfort. 

PAVA is significantly more potent than CS gas. The operating distance is the distance between the canister and the subject's eyes, not the distance between the user and the subject.

Effects
PAVA primarily affects the eyes, causing closure and severe pain. The pain to the eyes is reported to be greater than that caused by CS. The effectiveness rate is very high once PAVA gets into the eyes; however, there have been occasions where PAVA and CS have failed to work—especially when the subject is under the influence of alcohol or other drugs. Exposure to fresh moving air will normally result in a significant recovery from the effects of PAVA, within 15–35 minutes.

Pharmacologically, like other capsaicinoids, PAVA works by direct binding to receptors (TRPV1) that normally produce the pain and sensation of heat, as if exposed to scalding heat.

Usage 
PAVA is used widely as a less lethal, temporary defence tool around the world including in the United States, the United Kingdom, India, and others.

British Police and HM Prison Service
PAVA is approved for police and prison service use in the United Kingdom. British police forces had traditionally used CS gas spray, but with the more widespread carriage of tasers, PAVA has now entirely replaced its predecessor due to its non-flammable nature.

Both PAVA and CS are prohibited under Section 5 of the Firearms Act 1968 as a: "weapon of whatever description designed or adapted for the discharge of any noxious liquid, gas or other thing", meaning that it is unlawful for a member of the public to possess them. Police officers, prison officers and other servants of the Crown, have lawful exemption to possess and use PAVA. They are therefore exempt from prosecution under this act and section.

Legal restrictions 
 United States: California, Minnesota, Delaware, Washington DC and Wisconsin restrict use of less than lethal projectiles and devices using them. 

 United Kingdom: Citizens may not use PAVA, under Section 5 of the Firearms Act 1968, however, police, prison officers and other officials are allowed to use PAVA to uphold the law.

Treatment
There are various treatments to combat the effects of nonivamide. One popular method includes administering a one to one solution of milk of magnesia, and water to the eyes. Doctors also recommend not using oils or creams on the skin, and to not wear contact lenses, if one is planning to feel the effects of nonivamide.

See also 
 Nonivamide

References

Chemical weapons
Lachrymatory agents
Incapacitating agents